'Let Me Tell Ya 'Bout Root Beer is the first professionally recorded release by alternative rock band Incubus. The EP was released in 1995, and contained two songs, "New Skin" and "Azwethinkweiz", which later appeared on S.C.I.E.N.C.E. and Enjoy Incubus, respectively.

Track listing

1995 debut EPs
Incubus (band) albums